George Henry Bennett  (8 July 1913 – 31 August 1970) was a Welsh rugby union, and professional rugby league footballer who played in the 1920s, 1930s and 1940s.

Background
Bennett was born in Newport, Monmouthshire, and he died aged 57.

Rugby union career
Bennett started his career as a rugby union player, joining Weston-super-Mare in 1929. He left Wales due to the racism of the Welsh Rugby Union preventing him from playing for the national team, and signed for rugby league side Wigan in November 1930.

Rugby league career

Wigan
Bennett played  in Wigan's 15–3 victory over Salford in the Championship Final during the 1933–34 season at Wilderspool Stadium, Warrington on Saturday 28 April 1934. He also played  in Wigan's 30–27 victory over France at Central Park, Wigan, on Saturday 10 March 1934. Bennett played left-, i.e. number 4, and scored a try in Wigan's 12–21 defeat by Salford in the 1934–35 Lancashire County Cup Final during the 1934–35 season at Station Road, Swinton on Saturday 20 October 1934. In December 1937, after losing his place as a first team regular, he joined Bradford Northern.

Bradford Northern
Bennett played 151 games for Bradford, including the final of the 1944 Challenge Cup victory over Wigan.

International honours
Bennett won three caps for Wales (RL) in 1935–1936 while at Wigan, becoming the first black man to represent a British national team at rugby league. In 1936 he was to tour Australia with the England team but was omitted to "avoid criticism" due to the colour of his skin.

Note
George Bennet's surname is variously spelt with two T's as Bennett, or with a single T as Bennet.

References

External links
Statistics at wigan.rlfans.com
The struggle and the scrum
(archived by web.archive.org) Photograph "Hallmark Family"
Photograph "Hallmark Family"
Photograph "Wigan Rugby Players"
Photograph "Wigan Rugby Players"
Photograph "Hallmark Family" 

1913 births
1970 deaths
Black British sportsmen
Bradford Bulls players
Castleford Tigers players
Footballers who switched code
People from Welshpool
Risca RFC players
Rugby league centres
Rugby league five-eighths
Rugby league halfbacks
Rugby league players from Powys
Rugby union players from Powys
Wales national rugby league team players
Welsh rugby league players
Welsh rugby union players
Wigan Warriors players